Hugo Fílipe de Sousa Pereira (born 20 March 1988) known as Huguinho, is a Portuguese footballer who plays for Freamunde as a defender.

Football career
On 4 May 2013, Huguinho made his professional debut with Leixões in a 2012–13 Segunda Liga match against Vitória Guimarães B.

References

External links

Stats and profile at LPFP 

1988 births
Living people
Sportspeople from Vila Nova de Gaia
Portuguese footballers
Association football defenders
Boavista F.C. players
Leixões S.C. players
Liga Portugal 2 players
S.C. Freamunde players